Presidential elections were held in El Salvador in January 1944. Maximiliano Hernández Martínez was the only candidate and won the election, but no results were posted.

References

Bibliography
Anderson, Thomas P (1971) Matanza: El Salvador's communist revolt of 1932 Lincoln: University of Nebraska Press
Political Handbook of the world, 1944 New York, 1945
Williams, Philip J. and Knut Walter (1997) Militarization and demilitarization in El Salvador's transition to democracy Pittsburgh: University of Pittsburgh Press

El Salvador
Presidential elections in El Salvador
President
Single-candidate elections
Election and referendum articles with incomplete results